Candelas vita is a 1995 studio album by Candela. For the album, the band was awarded a Grammis Award in the "Dansband of the Year" category. With the song "Jag önskar mig", which went on the Swedish record chart Svensktoppen in November 1995, the band got a hit.

Track listing
Sommar en dag i juni (Ulf Rundberg)
Vi rymmer i natt (Peter Bergqvist - Hans Backström)
Där vallmoblomman står (Dan Stråhed)
Det finaste som finns (Thomas Thörnholm - Patrick Öhlund)
Ingenting är bättre (Calle Kindbom - Carl Lösnitz)
Säg aldrig farväl (Bo Nilsson)
Kan vi träffas nå'n gång (Ann Orson - Blanche Carte/Monica Forsberg)
Malmö-Köpenhamn (Dan Stråhed - Kaj Svenling)
Jag ville vara nära dig (Mike Hawker - Ivor Raymonde/Britt Lindeborg)
Galen (Willie Nelsson/Åke Lindfors)
Ängel i natt (Peter Bergqvist - Hans Backström)
Jag borde gå (Per-Olof Löfgren)
Stanna en stund (PeO Pettersson)
Jag önskar mig (Per-Ola Lindholm)

References 

1995 albums
Candela (Swedish band) albums